Jean-Baptiste Barla (3 May 1817, Nice – 6 November 1896) was a French botanist.

Barla was a man of independent means and dedicated himself to investigate the fungi and orchids of the South of France. "Cette végétation exceptionelle, doit évidemment sa richesse et sa variété à la configuration topographique, toute particulière, du bassin des Alpes-Maritimes. Dans ce pays favorisé par la nature, croissent la plupart des orchidées de France, d'Italie, d'Allemange, etc." (Introduction to illustrée de Nice et des Alpes-Maritimes).

In 1846 with Jean Baptiste Vérany (1800–1865) he founded the Muséum d'histoire naturelle de Nice where wax casts of thousands of mushrooms he made or had made were exhibited.

Works
Partial list: 
1855 Tableau comparatif des champignons comestibles et vénéneux de Nice Nice Impr. Canis Frères.. 
1859 Les Champignons De La Province De Nice Nice Impr. Canis Frères.
1885 Liste des champignons nouvellement observés dans le département des Alpes-Maritimes. Sous-Genre I.- Amanita. Bull. Soc. Mycol.France 1: 189-194.
1886 Liste des champignons nouvellement observés dans le département des Alpes-Maritimes. Bull. Soc. Mycol. France 2(3): 112–119.
1868 Flore illustrée de Nice et des Alpes-Maritimes. Iconographie des Orchidées. Nice, Caisson et Mignon. Dedicated to the Italian botanist Filippo Parlatore, reprinted 1996.

References 

19th-century French botanists
1817 births
1896 deaths